St. Anthony Elementary School may refer to:
 An elementary school in Toronto
 An elementary school in Montreal